NASCAR on TNT was the tagname for any NASCAR series race that had been broadcast on TNT by Turner Sports between 2001 and 2014. The network continued Turner's longstanding relationship with NASCAR that dated back to its initial association with TBS Superstation.

TNT's final race was the 2014 Camping World RV Sales 301 on July 13, 2014.

Coverage history

Prior to 2001
Prior to 2001, Turner Sports' home for NASCAR was TNT's sister station, TBS. Booth announcers/analysts included Ken Squier, Buddy Baker, and Dick Berggren. After TBS made a host/booth switch, Allen Bestwick became the lap-by-lap announcer with Baker and Berggren in the booth for TBS' 2000 coverage at Lowe's and Pocono while Squier moved to a host position, the same position he had held at CBS since the start of the 1998 NASCAR season.

TBS typically covered the Coca-Cola 600 and UAW-GM Quality 500 at Charlotte, the July race at Pocono, and several NASCAR Busch Series races. TBS aired side by side coverage during commercials during the 2000 UAW-GM Quality 500.

When NASCAR's new broadcasting rights contract was signed in 1999, which included Fox, FX, and NBC, TBS was to keep its rights to NASCAR by serving as NBC's cable partner. The deal was to begin with the 2001 NASCAR season.

However, Turner elected to move the race coverage to sister network TNT as part of its new branding and "We Know Drama" slogan. Also, TBS' coverage of Atlanta Braves baseball games, which were a staple of the channel lineup for years, often was aired on weekends afternoon or evening and would clash with NASCAR races.

2001–2006
TNT aired its first NASCAR Winston Cup Series race under the new contract at New Hampshire International Speedway in July 2001. Both networks shared the broadcast team of Allen Bestwick, Benny Parsons, and Wally Dallenbach Jr. in the booth and Bill Weber, Marty Snider, Dave Burns, and Matt Yocum on pit road, as well as both being produced with Turner Sports' graphical look. The only differences were the placement of the network's logo on the graphics package and different colored pit reporter fire suits. Also, Liz Allison, widow of former driver Davey Allison, worked as a reporter exclusively for TNT during the 2001 season.

TNT was treated as the secondary broadcaster, as far as broadcast rights are concerned, during its relationship with NBC because it is a cable rather than broadcast network (Turner produced all of NBC's telecasts as well). NBC's portion of broadcast included almost all of the prestigious races during their half of the year (with the exception of the Mountain Dew Southern 500 at Darlington, the fourth leg of NASCAR's Grand Slam, in 2001 and 2002, and the Chevy Rock & Roll 400 at Richmond from 2004 to 2006, when the race was the last race of the regular season under the season format). The idea was that ratings would most certainly be higher for NBC's coverage of a given race next to TNT's due to a broadcaster's penetration. TNT was given most of the Busch Series schedule except for major races, then covered by NBC. Night races were almost always covered by TNT except for the Pepsi 400 at Daytona, which aired on NBC in years that they had the rights to it, and (later) the UAW-GM Quality 500 at Charlotte when that race was moved from Sunday afternoons to Saturday nights. Otherwise, following the fall Richmond race, TNT's Cup Series coverage was limited to one, two or three races (including the Pop Secret Microwave Popcorn 400 at Rockingham, which they covered from 2001 to 2003).

It was generally understood that anytime a major news story needed to be covered by NBC its NASCAR coverage would be switched over to TNT. This occurred only once: the October 7, 2001 race at Lowe's Motor Speedway was interrupted during the prerace show when President George W. Bush announced the beginning of Operation Enduring Freedom in response to the September 11, 2001 attacks. NBC covered the news until 25 laps to go (simulcast with TNT), and the entire race was shown on TNT.

TNT also would broadcast any NBC-scheduled races that were postponed by rain until the following day, much like FX would do for Fox during this contract (this is no longer applicable as Fox airs rain-delayed races the following day, since Fox has no daytime programming, unlike ABC, CBS and NBC).

The TNT–NBC partnership broke off when NBC chose not to bid for the NASCAR contract when it expired in 2006.

2007–2014
TNT, however, elected to make a bid for rights in the new television contract and was successful in retaining its coverage, joining Fox and the ESPN family of networks in a contract that ran until 2014. Under the terms of said contract TNT gained broadcast rights to six June and July races, which it calls the NASCAR on TNT Summer Series. TNT's six races in 2014 were the Pocono 400 at Pocono Raceway, the Quicken Loans 400 at Michigan International Speedway, the Toyota/Save Mart 350 at Sonoma Raceway, the Quaker State 400 at Kentucky Speedway, the annual July 4 weekend Coke Zero 400 at Daytona International Speedway, and the Camping World RV Sales 301 at New Hampshire Motor Speedway.

Unlike in the previous contract TNT was not able to procure rights to any Nationwide Series races, as ESPN successfully bid to be the exclusive carrier of the series. However, TNT became the exclusive home for the Coke Zero 400, much like Fox had become exclusive home for the Daytona 500 — in the previous contract, Fox and NBC alternated coverage of the two races at Daytona, with Fox airing the Daytona 500 and NBC the Pepsi 400 in odd-numbered years, and vice versa in even-numbered years.

Bill Weber stayed on as TNT's NASCAR voice and Wally Dallenbach Jr. was retained to be his color commentator. Originally, Benny Parsons was to join the two in the booth, but he died from lung cancer prior to the beginning of the 2007 season. Kyle Petty elected to take time off from his driving duties to take the position in the broadcast booth. Marty Snider and Matt Yocum returned as pit reporters. To replace Allen Bestwick and Dave Burns, both of whom went to ESPN following the 2006 season, TNT promoted Ralph Sheheen and Lindsay Czarniak to full-time pit reporter positions; previously both of them served as substitutes or for stand-alone Busch Series races that conflicted with the Cup Series schedule. To round out the coverage, Larry McReynolds was loaned by Fox to provide analysis and explanations.

2007–2009
From 2007 to 2009, TNT's pre-race coverage began with a one-hour show called NASCAR on TNT Live! This was followed by a 30-minute version of Countdown to Green, followed by the race itself. The pre-race coverage was changed in 2010 to a simple one-hour version of Countdown to Green due to NASCAR's new policy of earlier start times. Since 2007, each pre-race broadcast (whether it be on NASCAR on TNT Live or Countdown to Green) featured "The Pride of NASCAR" segment which featured an interview with a historical NASCAR figure. Some examples include Richard Petty (interviewed by his son Kyle), A. J. Foyt, and Mario Andretti.

One of the most popular features of TNT's coverage is RaceBuddy, a free online application on NASCAR.com that allows fans to watch the race through their choice of several camera angles. In 2009, Jim Noble was added as the RaceBuddy-only pit reporter.

On July 7, 2007, during the Pepsi 400, TNT used for the first time a new broadcast format called "Wide-Open Coverage". The race broadcast was moved to the top of the screen, with all scoring graphics placed in the bottom of the screen.  The race was also broadcast with limited commercial interruption; only three green flag laps took place during commercials during the entire broadcast, because of cable and satellite television providers having several minutes every hour to air local ads, bypassing TNT entirely. All other commercials were aired in the lower third of the screen, similar to what is used by the IndyCar Series but with a significantly larger window for the race coverage. Most of these commercials featured a special ad for that race, followed by their traditional ad. For each Daytona race through 2012, TNT featured the Wide-Open Coverage format. In 2009 and 2010, no green flag laps were missed. In 2013, the format was only used for the last 30 laps, as they were only able to get two sponsors for the format, and in 2014, was dropped entirely due to the race being delayed to Sunday by rain.

During the broadcast of the 2008 LifeLock.com 400, Larry McReynolds performed a magic trick, "cutting" Marc Fein in half while green flag racing was taking place on the racetrack.  This came at the dismay and outrage of many fans and viewers.

TNT also missed the winning pass of the 2008 Coke Zero 400 when a last lap crash involving Michael Waltrip took out several cars.  When it was all said and done, TNT panned over to Carl Edwards, who prematurely celebrated his victory, thinking he had the lead when the caution came out.  Because the crash occurred on the last lap, the field is frozen at the moment the caution came out and NASCAR reviews the finishing order by using video replays and scoring loop data.  Those replays all showed Kyle Busch as the leader when the caution came out; Busch was declared the winner of the Coke Zero 400.

2010–2014
The 2010 race also featured a 3-D broadcast on some cable/satellite providers and on NASCAR.com.

There were some technical issues with TNT's final Sprint Cup race of the season at Chicagoland when the picture and sound went out during the prerace show, causing the invocation and the national anthem to not be televised.

Beginning with the Party at the Poconos 400 race on June 9, 2013, TNT's NASCAR coverage switched to a 16:9 aspect ratio letterbox format, though it did retain its on-air graphics package that has been in use since 2007.  The ticker across the top of the screen also changed, with the lap counter and TNT network logo both being moved to the upper right-hand corner of the screen.  The screen on TNT's standard-definition 4:3 feed now airs a letterboxed version of the native HD feed to match that of Fox's and ESPN's respective default widescreen SD presentations.  NASCAR on TNT was the last of the 3 broadcast partners to switch to a widescreen presentation. NBC became the 4th to switch to letterbox format on SD feeds in 2015.

The end of NASCAR on TNT and Turner Sports
The 2014 Camping World RV Sales 301, on July 13, at New Hampshire Motor Speedway, was the final NASCAR race televised on TNT in its fourteen years with the network and marked the end of NASCAR's total 32-year run on Turner Sports, dating back to 1983; in the wake of former co-partner NBC signing a new agreement to televise races from the major NASCAR series (mainly Cup Series and Xfinity Series as well as Mexico Series races on its Spanish-language networks). Thus, TNT decided to devote a large segment of the pre-race show to showing clips of signature NASCAR moments to air on both it and TBS; and also welcomed NASCAR president Mike Helton to the TNT booth to talk about the relationship of NASCAR with Turner Sports, as Helton had been president of the Atlanta Motor Speedway when Turner Sports showed its first race at AMS, which had aired on TBS in 1983, 32 years prior. Finally, the conclusive pre-race broadcast in fourteen years of NASCAR on TNT was closed out by former TBS lead announcer and New England native Ken Squier,.

During NASCAR's 32-year run on Turner Sports, the races aired on TBS (1983–2000) and TNT (2001–2014).

Commentators
Adam Alexander (now with Fox NASCAR)
Wally Dallenbach Jr.
Kyle Petty (now with NASCAR on NBC)
Ralph Sheheen (now with Speedsport)
Matt Yocum (now with CBS Sports)
Marty Snider (now with NASCAR on NBC)
Chris Neville
Larry McReynolds (now with Fox NASCAR)
Bill Weber
Marc Fein
Allen Bestwick
Benny Parsons
Phil Parsons (now with Fox NASCAR)
Lindsay Czarniak (now with Fox NASCAR, Fox Major League Baseball and Fox NFL)

Broadcast team history
TNT and NBC shared the broadcast team of Allen Bestwick on lap-by-lap and Benny Parsons and Wally Dallenbach Jr. on color commentary. Dave Burns, Matt Yocum, Marty Snider, and Bill Weber were the pit reporters, with Weber hosting the Countdown to Green pre-race show.

When TNT would broadcast Busch Series races that conflicted with the Cup races, other pit reporters, such as Glenn Jarrett, Mark Garrow, Ralph Sheheen, and Lindsay Czarniak would join the coverage.

In 2004, Weber became the lap-by-lap announcer for two races as Bestwick recovered from a leg injury he suffered while playing hockey.

2005–2006
In 2005, Bestwick and Weber traded positions.  However, Bestwick would occasionally do lap-by-lap for Busch races that conflicted with the schedule for the primary series. Bestwick also filled in for lap-by-lap commentary at the Fall Phoenix Busch race when Weber became ill with laryngitis.

2007–2009
For 2007, TNT went solo, covering six races that started with the Pocono 500 on June 10.  Weber and Dallenbach returned to the broadcast booth.  After Parsons' death from cancer, he was replaced by Kyle Petty, who took time off from his driving duties at Petty Enterprises to do so. Weber also continued to host the pre-race shows, NASCAR on TNT Live and Allstate Countdown to Green, joined by Marc Fein and Fox Sports' Larry McReynolds (producer Barry Landis also came over from Fox for these six races). Like the other networks, TNT has adopted a "cut-away" car (provided by Ford) that McReynolds uses occasionally on the telecasts.  Also during the race, Fein and McReynolds contribute to the coverage from a large infield studio that revolves from a point several feet above ground level.

Marty Snider and Matt Yocum returned as pit reporters. Ralph Sheheen and Lindsay Czarniak joined the team full-time for 2007, replacing Dave Burns and Allen Bestwick who had jumped to ESPN.

On June 24, Petty contributed to the broadcast from inside the race car at Infineon Raceway during the Toyota/Save Mart 350.  During the race, he uttered an obscenity that was picked up by the network's microphones after he was involved in a crash on lap 1 with Matt Kenseth and Marc Goossens.  Weber apologized to viewers, and Petty's status at TNT appeared to be secure despite the incident.  No fines were issued by the Federal Communications Commission (FCC) for the incident as cable television is not subjected to the FCC's indecency policies.

The broadcast remained the same in the 2008 and 2009 seasons. However, halfway through TNT's 2009 race coverage, Weber was suspended by TNT for an incident at a hotel and was replaced in the broadcast booth by Sheheen. TNT later announced that Weber would not return for the Daytona or Chicagoland races, leading many to believe that he was fired by the network, and named Sheheen as his replacement. To take Sheheen's place on pit road TNT turned to SPEED's NASCAR Gander RV & Outdoors Truck Series pit reporter Adam Alexander.

2010–2014
On February 25, 2010, USA Today and Jayski's Silly Season Site confirmed that Weber's TNT contract was not renewed, but that he was still under a general motorsports contract with NBC (which reportedly may also include NASCAR Whelen Modified Tour coverage on Versus, whose parent Comcast was buying NBC Universal). NASCAR.com reported on March 3, 2010, that Weber would be replaced by Adam Alexander and Sheheen would return to pit reporting. To replace Weber as pre-race show host Lindsay Czarniak was moved from the pits to take his place. TNT hired SPEED's Phil Parsons to take Lindsay's place. Parsons didn't return for 2011. Kyle Petty joined Czarniak and Larry McReynolds for the pre-race programs for the 2010 season, as Marc Fein was moved to TBS' Sunday major league baseball broadcasts.  Fein left Turner Sports altogether in 2012 (he joined Dallas NBC affiliate KXAS as an anchor that year).  Czarniak did not return for the 2012 season (she joined ESPN as an anchor for SportsCenter in 2011).  In 2012, lap-by-lap race announcer Adam Alexander added pre-race show host to his responsibilities.

Wide Open Coverage
The Coke Zero 400 was broadcast in TNT's Wide Open Coverage format. The format was similar to the Side-by-Side format used in IndyCar broadcasts, limiting commercial breaks to only those required by their cable and satellite partners, mostly during yellow and red flag portions. The result meant almost no green flag racing was missed. A 3-D telecast was available in the United States on Comcast, Bright House Networks and Time Warner cable systems as well as NASCAR.com and DirecTV, marking a historic first in NASCAR racing.

See also
 NASCAR on NBC
 NASCAR on TBS
 Fox NASCAR

References

External links

Bill Weber is officially fired 
New Play-by-Play announcer for TNT 
Ratings For NASCAR on TNT Since 2008

TNT
TNT (American TV network) original programming
Turner Sports
2001 American television series debuts
2014 American television series endings